The Maruia Maquis skink (Phasmasaurus maruia) is a species of skink found in New Caledonia.

References

Phasmasaurus
Reptiles described in 1998
Skinks of New Caledonia
Endemic fauna of New Caledonia
Taxa named by Ross Allen Sadlier
Taxa named by Anthony Whitaker
Taxa named by Aaron M. Bauer